This is a list of the number-one hits of 1988 on Italian Hit Parade Singles Chart.

Number-one artists

References

1988
1988 in Italian music
1988 record charts